NPR Music is a project of National Public Radio, an American privately and publicly funded non-profit membership media organization, that launched in November 2007 to present public radio music programming and original editorial content for music discovery. NPR Music offers current and archival podcasts, live concert webcasts, reviews, music lists, news, studio sessions, and interviews to listen to from NPR and partner public radio stations across the country, as well as an index of public radio music stations streaming live on the Internet.  There have been two blogs: "Monitor Mix" (now defunct) by Sleater-Kinney musician Carrie Brownstein and the All Songs Considered Blog by Bob Boilen and Robin Hilton.

Programming

Programs available to hear at NPR Music
 All Songs Considered, hosted by Bob Boilen
 Alt.Latino, hosted by Jasmine Garsd and Felix Contreras
 From the Top, hosted by Christopher O'Riley
 JazzSet hosted by Dee Dee Bridgewater, WBGO
Mountain Stage hosted by Larry Groce, West Virginia Public Broadcasting
 Piano Jazz hosted by Marian McPartland
World Cafe hosted by David Dye, WXPN
 NPR World of Opera hosted by Lisa Simeone

Podcasts available at NPR Music
 All Songs Considered hosted by Bob Boilen
 Alt.Latino, hosted by Jasmine Garsd and Felix Contreras
 Live Concerts from All Songs Considered 
 Second Stage hosted by Robin Hilton
 NPR Music Podcast
 World Cafe Words & Music hosted by Talia Schlanger, WXPN
 World Cafe Next hosted by David Dye, WXPN
 Jazz Profiles hosted by Nancy Wilson
 Piano Jazz Shorts hosted by Marian McPartland
 The Thistle & Shamrock, Celtic music hosted by Fiona Ritchie

Live Concert Series
 Live Concerts from All Songs Considered, webcasting live from The 9:30 Club in Washington, D.C. and other venues
 Live From The Village Vanguard
 Discoveries at Walt Disney Concert Hall
 Classics in Concert
 Live From South by Southwest
 Live From The Newport Folk Festival
 Live From The Newport Jazz Festival
 XPN Live Fridays
 Mountain Stage
 Toast of the Nation
 Live From The Monterey Jazz Festival
 Tiny Desk Concerts, a video series of live performances by artists at the NPR Music office
 Studio Sessions, videos of performances by artists from media partners and member stations
 Field Recordings, videos of performances by musicians in unconventional locations from media partners and member stations

References

External links
home page National Public Radio website
music tab NPR website
podcast partners NPR website

NPR
Podcasting companies
Sirius Satellite Radio channels
American music websites
Jazz awards